SXL may refer to:

 SXL, the IATA code for Sligo Airport, Strandhill, County Sligo, Ireland
SXL (band), a 1987–1988 jazz fusion ensemble formed by Bill Laswell
Selonian language (ISO 639-3 code)
Sex-lethal or Sxl gene, a gene important in alternative splicing
SXL, the NYSE ticker symbol for Sunoco Logistics Partners L.P.